Amy's Spikers were a professional women's volleyball club that briefly played in the Philippine Superliga (PSL). It is owned by Sonia Trading, Inc., distributor of Amy's Kitchen products. It debuted in 2015 during the PSL Beach Challenge Cup. For 2016, it competed for one conference only, in partnership with the UPHSD Altas women's volleyball team.

Honors

References

See also
 New San Jose Builders Victorias

Women's volleyball teams in the Philippines
Philippine Super Liga
2016 establishments in the Philippines
Volleyball clubs established in 2016